Major General Shakil Ahmed SPP, BGBM, nswc, afwc, psc is a two-star general of the Bangladesh Army. Currently he is serving as General Officer Commanding of 66th Infantry Division & Area Commander, Rangpur Area. He served as the Director General of Boarder Guards Bangladesh (BGB). Prior to this appointment, he served as Adjutant general of Army Headquarters. Before that he has served as the General Officers Commanding of 19th Infantry Division in ghatail.

Education 
Ahmed was born on 19 December 1968 in Joypurhat District, East Pakistan, Pakistan. He completed his postgraduate education in National Security and War Studies, and Strategic Studies and Defense Studies.

Career 
Ahmed was commissioned in the Infantry corps of Bangladesh Army on 19 December 1988.  

Ahmed commanded the 99th Composite Brigade and East Bengal Regiment. He was the Chief Instructor at the School of Infantry and Tactics and later commandant. 

During Ahmed's tenure at Army Headquarter as AG he signed a significant deal on ‘Bangladesh Military Contingent Agreement 2021’ with Kuwait Army Assistant Chief of Staff Major General Khaled AHHM Al Qadri. This deal will ensure Bangladesh Military Contingent would assist in Kuwait as part of Operation Rebuilding Kuwait (ORK), which in Bengali is known as Operation Kuwait Punargathan (OKP). 

Ahmed was appointed as the director general to the Department of Immigration and Passports Office in September 2019. He replaced Major General Md Shohail Hossain Khan who was made chairman of Bangladesh Tea Board.

On 18 February 2022, Ahmed was appointed as Director General of Border Guards Bangladesh replacing Major General Shafeenul Islam. Shafeenul Islam is set to retire from the Army. Ahmed is the Vice-President of Bangladesh Golf Federation and Kurmitola Golf Club.

References 

Bangladesh Army generals
Bangladeshi military personnel
Bangladeshi generals
1968 births
Living people
Director Generals of Border Guards Bangladesh
People from Joypurhat District